Borj-e Yusefi (also Romanized as Borj-e Yūsefī, Borj Yūsefī, and Borj Yūsofī) is a village in Sardasht Rural District, Zeydun District, Behbahan County, Khuzestan Province, Iran. At the 2006 census, its population was 137, in 29 families.

References 

Populated places in Behbahan County